Palestine Evangelical Lutheran Church is a church in  Marshall County, South Dakota. The church is situated northeast of Veblen, South Dakota. The church was built in Victorian Gothic style during 1903. It  was added to the National Register of Historic Places in 1982.

References

Lutheran churches in South Dakota
Churches on the National Register of Historic Places in South Dakota
Gothic Revival church buildings in South Dakota
Churches completed in 1903
Churches in Marshall County, South Dakota
National Register of Historic Places in Marshall County, South Dakota